Lieutenant General D. B. Shekatkar PVSM, AVSM, VSM is a retired Indian army officer. He was commissioned on 30 June 1963 into the Maratha Light Infantry. He is currently the chancellor of Sikkim Central University.

Role in Kashmir 
General Shekatkar was instrumental in the surrender of 1267 terrorists in Jammu and Kashmir who had been trained in Afghanistan and Pakistan. Post surrender the militants returned to normal life.

The largest number of surrenders in a day also took place under Shekatkar's command in 1995 when he was a major general — 95 militants surrendered in Aragam and Malanam in Baramulla district on 1 October which was the largest surrender of militants in the valley till then. Majority of the militants were from Hizbul Mujaheddin.

Served as Commandant of Infantry School.

Shekatkar Committee was formed by centre under ministry of defence to suggest steps for enhancing combat capability of the armed forces.some of the recommendations are
1.closure of military farms and army postal establishments in peace locations
2.more recruitment of clerical staff and drivers in the army
3.to improve efficiency of the National cadet corps

References 

Living people
Recipients of the Param Vishisht Seva Medal
Year of birth missing (living people)
National Defence Academy (India) alumni
Indian Military Academy alumni
Sikkim University